Tragocephala crassicornis is a species of beetle in the family Cerambycidae. It was described by Karl Jordan in 1903.

Varieties
 Tragocephala crassicornis var. ochrescens Breuning, 1934
 Tragocephala crassicornis var. grandidieri Breuning, 1934

References

crassicornis
Beetles described in 1903